The 1641 Tabriz earthquake occurred on the night of February 5 in present-day East Azerbaijan province, Iran. The earthquake had an estimated surface-wave magnitude of 6.8 and an epicenter between Lake Urmia and the city of Tabriz. It was one of the most destructive earthquakes in the region, resulting in the loss of up to 30,000 lives.

Tectonic setting
Iran is situated on an active convergent boundary zone where the Arabian and Eurasian plates collide. The convergence occurs along the Zagros Mountains where it is accommodated by an active fold and thrust belt. The convergence is also accommodated within central Iran by strike-slip faults. At Tabriz, the rate of convergence is estimated to be about 20 mm/yr. The city is located near a triple junction of the Arabian, Anatolian and Eurasian plates. The oblique convergence results in continental collision beneath the Caucasus and right-lateral strike-slip tectonics around Tabriz. One of the most prominent fault is the North Tabriz Fault, a WNW–ESE-trending,  fault. The fault produced devastating earthquakes in 1721, 1780, and 1786.

Earthquake
The  6.8 earthquake ruptured a fault structure located south of the North Tabriz Fault. The North Tabriz Fault itself did not rupture during the quake. The plausible location of the earthquake is along the Dehkhargan Fault, a  left-lateral fault. Normal fault features are a common occurrence in the earthquake area. It strikes NE–SW between the cities of Osku and Azarshahr.

Damage
Researchers Nicholas Ambraseys and Charles P. Melville reported that the earthquake occurred on a Friday night. The communities of Khosrowshah, Osku and what is now present-day Azarshahr were completely devastated. Nearly all houses and public infrastructures, including historical monuments in Tabriz were razed to the ground. Many public baths and caravansaries were destroyed. A building in the city collapsed and buried many animals that were taking shelter from the winter season. Two important structures, the Masjid-i Ustad-Shagird and Arg of Tabriz suffered heavy damage. A large number of mosques experienced serious damage to their domes and minarets. The shock was also felt in Baghdad. On Sahand, a rockslide was triggered, destroying a village and killing many. Fissures appeared in the ground and erupted water. The earthquake was misdated to the years 1441, 1049, 1639, 1642, 1646, and 1651. Efforts to recover personal belongings and the dead continued for a month. Aftershocks were felt for six months. In the immediate aftermath of the earthquake, many survivors resided outside the ruins of their homes. Some residents returned to their homes but were killed due to collapses during the aftershocks. During the first two months after the earthquake, up to seven aftershocks were felt in a day.

See also
List of historical earthquakes
List of earthquakes in Iran

References

1641 earthquakes
History of Tabriz
1641 in Asia
Earthquakes in Iran
History of East Azerbaijan Province